Corentin Moutet was the defending champion but lost in the second round to Julien Benneteau.

Hubert Hurkacz won the title after defeating Ričardas Berankis 7–5, 6–1 in the final.

Seeds

Draw

Finals

Top half

Bottom half

References
Main Draw
Qualifying Draw

Brest Challenger - Singles